Olympus is a Canadian/British fantasy television series that premiered on Syfy in the USA and Super Channel in Canada on 2 April 2015. A retelling of Greek myths, the first season had thirteen episodes, and concluded on 2 July 2015. The series was cancelled in July 2015, and was poorly received by critics.

Premise
The story of how several brave men and women banished the gods from Olympus to the unconscious realm, a place dubbed as the Kingdom of Hades, or the underworld. A young man, Hero, attempts to find the truths of his past and shed light on the future, which will inevitably link back to the gods themselves.

Cast

Main
 Tom York as Hero
 Sonya Cassidy as the Oracle of Gaia (Pandora)
 Sonita Henry as Medea
 Graham Shiels as Aegeus
 Cas Anvar as Xerxes
 John Emmet Tracy as Pallas
 Wayne Burns as Lykos
 Matt Frewer as Daedalus
 Alan C. Peterson as Minos
 Sophia Lauchlin Hirt as Ariadne

Recurring
 Ben Cotton as Cyrus
 Spencer Drever as Alcimenes
 Levi Meaden as Kimon

Broadcast
Olympus has been acquired by Spike for broadcast in the United Kingdom and Ireland from 15 April 2015 at 10 pm. The series premiered on Syfy in the United States on 2 April 2015.

Critical reception
Critical reviews for the series were mostly negative, particularly for the campy acting, the heavy use of green screens, the special effects and for being similar to earlier fantasy epics, with Keith Uhlich of The Hollywood Reporter calling it "300 as shot for $300".

Episodes

References

External links
 
 
 
 

2010s British drama television series
2015 British television series debuts
2015 British television series endings
2010s Canadian drama television series
2015 Canadian television series debuts
2015 Canadian television series endings
British fantasy television series
Canadian fantasy television series
English-language television shows
Television series based on classical mythology